Joseph Albert Quarm is a Ghanaian politician and member of the Seventh Parliament of the Fourth Republic of Ghana representing the Manso-Nkwanta Constituency in the Ashanti Region on the ticket of the New Patriotic Party.

Early life and education 
Quarm was born on 7 May 1975 and hails from Manso Nsiana in the Ashanti Region of Ghana. He had his BSc in Biological Sciences, his PhD in Biological Sciences and further had his MPHIL in Biological Sciences in KNUST.

Career 
Quarm was a tutor in Vicande School from 1996 to 1998. He also worked at Central Gold African Ghana Limited as a part time Environmental Officer in 2007. He was also the CEO of Prof Quarm Publications Limited from 1995 to 2016. He was also the CEO of Prof Quarm Hospital Complex from 2012 to 2016, CEO of Prof Quarm Football Club and CEO of Prof Quarm Construction Limited. He is a land reclamation expert, land advocate, research scientist and mining consultant.

Politics 
Quarm is a member of the New Patriotic Party and is the former member of parliament for Manso Nkwanta Constituency in the Ashanti Region. In June 2015, he won the NPP primaries against Grace Addo who was the Member of Parliament of Manso Nkwanta Constituency. In the 2016 Ghanaian general election, Quarm won the parliamentary seat with 32,140 votes making 83.26% of the total votes cast whilst the NDC parliamentary aspirant Alex Kwame Bonsu had 5,503 votes making 14.26% of the total votes cast.

Personal life 
Quarm is a Christian.

Honor 
In March 2022, Quarm was honored by the West Africa International Press Limited with the Heroes of Distinction Award.

Controversy 
In 2016, Quarm stated in his book ‘Natural Science for Primary Schools – Pupil’s Book 1,’ that the human head is used for carrying loads. He was criticized by Kofi Bentil, Vice President of IMANI Ghana and social media users who called for the withdrawal of the books from basic schools. The Ministry of Education released a statement for schools in Ghana not to patronize the book.

References

Ghanaian MPs 2017–2021
1975 births
Living people
New Patriotic Party politicians